Krstova Gora (Serbian Cyrillic: Крстова Гора; literally: The Cross Mount) is a hill in the immediate vicinity of the town of Teslić in Republic of Srpska, Bosnia and Herzegovina.

The altitude of the hill top is about 270 m, with the town center being on about 202 m. The Krstova Gora is located about 2 km to the west from the town center. It physically divides the village of Ružević to the two local communities: Gornji Ružević and Donji Ružević (literally: upper and lower Ružević, respectively).

Up to the war in Bosnia and Herzegovina The Krstova Gora was named The Gračun. The name was changed in the post-war period, when first regulation of the hill were undergone.  In that period the two approaches to the hill top were improved.  Pedestrian trail from the south now starts with concrete stairs and the vehicle road from the north is repaired. On the very top of the hill a several meter high metal cross is erected, standing on a two meter high concrete foundation. The cross is painted in bright colours making it clearly visible in daylight and during the night it is marked with spotlights. The cross represents local Orthodox Christian population which makes the absolute majority. The cross was the basis for the new name of formerly The Gračun hill.

While entering the town from direction of Banja Luka (west) the hill and the cross are clearly visible to the left, just at the immediate entrance to the town.

Mountains of Republika Srpska
Teslić
Mountains of Bosnia and Herzegovina